Mary Mailvaganam Rajamani (born 11 November 1943) is a Malaysian sprinter. She competed in the women's 400 metres at the 1964 Summer Olympics.

In 1968, he was awarded with the Member of the Order of the Defender of the Realm (A.M.N.) in Malaysia.

References

1943 births
Living people
Athletes (track and field) at the 1964 Summer Olympics
Malaysian female sprinters
Olympic athletes of Malaysia
Athletes (track and field) at the 1966 British Empire and Commonwealth Games
Commonwealth Games competitors for Malaysia
Athletes (track and field) at the 1966 Asian Games
Asian Games gold medalists for Malaysia
Asian Games bronze medalists for Malaysia
Asian Games medalists in athletics (track and field)
Medalists at the 1966 Asian Games
Place of birth missing (living people)
Members of the Order of the Defender of the Realm
Olympic female sprinters
Southeast Asian Games medalists in athletics
Southeast Asian Games gold medalists for Malaysia